The 1964 Minnesota Golden Gophers football team represented the University of Minnesota in the 1964 Big Ten Conference football season. In their 11th year under head coach Murray Warmath, the Golden Gophers compiled a 5–4 record and outscored their opponents by a combined total of 136 to 131.
 
Center Joe Pung received the team's Most Valuable Player award. Back Kraig Lofquist and end Aaron Brown were named All-Big Ten first team. Center Joe Pung and fullback Mike Reid were named All-Big Ten second team.

Total attendance at five home games was 268,908, an average of 53,782 per game. The largest crowd was against Iowa. Memorial Staidum was the home of the Golden Gophers from 1924-1981

Schedule

Game summaries

Michigan

In the fifth game of the season, Minnesota lost to Michigan 19–12 in Ann Arbor. Prior to 1964, Michigan had lost four consecutive games in the annual contest for the Little Brown Jug. Michigan led the game 19–0 in the fourth quarter and held off a comeback attempt by the Golden Gophers. Minnesota scored two fourth-quarter touchdowns, but missed twice on two-point conversion attempts. The Golden Gophers closed the score to 19–12 on a 91-yard interception return by Kraig Lofquist. They subsequently drove to the Michigan three-yard line, but the Michigan defense held on fourth down.

References

Minnesota
Minnesota Golden Gophers football seasons
Minnesota Golden Gophers football